Stierling's wren-warbler (Calamonastes stierlingi), is a species of bird in the family Cisticolidae found in southern Africa.   It is sometimes considered a subspecies of the miombo wren-warbler.

References

External links
 Stierling's wren-warbler - Species text in The Atlas of Southern African Birds.

Stierling's wren-warbler
Birds of Southern Africa
Stierling's wren-warbler